Rapur Assembly constituency was a constituency of the Andhra Pradesh Legislative Assembly, India until 2008.

Overview
It was part of the Nellore Lok Sabha constituency along with other six Vidhan Sabha segments, namely, Kandukur , Kavali, Atmakur, Nellore City, Nellore Rural and Udayagiri in Nellore district.

Mandals :
1.Rapur
2.Kaluvay
3.Sydapuram 
4.Podalkur 
5.Manubolu

Members of Legislative Assembly

Election results

Assembly elections 1952

Assembly elections 1994

Assembly Elections 1999

Assembly Elections 2004

See also
 List of constituencies of Andhra Pradesh Vidhan Sabha

References

Former assembly constituencies of Andhra Pradesh